The 2000 North Carolina gubernatorial election was held on November 7, 2000.  The general election was fought between the Republican nominee, former mayor of Charlotte Richard Vinroot and the Democratic nominee, state Attorney General Mike Easley.  Easley won by 52% to 46%, and succeeded fellow Democrat Jim Hunt as governor.

Primaries

Democratic

Candidates
Bob Ayers
Mike Easley, attorney general
Ken Rogers
Dennis Wicker, lieutenant governor

Results

Republican

Candidates
Leo Daughtry, state representative
Art Manning, candidate for governor in 1996
Charles Neely, attorney and former state representative
Richard Vinroot, former mayor of Charlotte and candidate for governor in 1996

Results

General election

Debates
Complete video of debate, September 13, 2000
Complete video of debate, October 27, 2000

Results

Footnotes

North Carolina
2000
Gubernatorial